Carla Juri (born 2 January 1985) is a Swiss actress. Her acting credits include 180°, Wetlands, Finsterworld and Blade Runner 2049.

Early life and education
Juri was raised in Ambrì, a village in the Italian-speaking Canton of Ticino in Switzerland. She is fluent in German, English and Italian. She learned German and Italian when she was young, and English at 15. Her father is a lawyer, and her mother is a sculptor  In school, she played ice hockey for HC Ambrì-Piotta and went on to be a forward for the Swiss  Class A team, SC Reinach. From 2005 until 2010, she studied theatre in Los Angeles and London. Juri started her acting career by hopping between auditions in Berlin, London and Rome. She maintained a busy schedule trying to find work while making use of her trilingualism.

From 2005 to 2007, Juri was coached by Douglas Matranga in Los Angeles. Between 2007 and 2008, she took part in the ensemble of the Theatrical Arts Theatre Company in Los Angeles. From 2008 to 2010, Juri attended acting classes at The Actors Centre in London.

Career 
Juri's first film appearance was in the short film Midday Room. In 2011, she received the Swiss Film Award in the Best Performance in a Supporting Role category for 180° (2010). In 2013, she was selected to receive the Shooting Star which is awarded annually to ten young European actors at the Berlin International Film Festival. She also played the leading role in the 2013 film adaptation of Wetlands. This is arguably the role she is best known for. The novel it is based on was a controversial best seller in Germany. To prepare for this role, Juri wore the clothes of her character, Helen, for several weeks and spent a lot of this time in Berlin, where her character lives. She even went undercover as a student at a high school where only the principal knew she was an actress. She appeared in the Blade Runner sequel, Blade Runner 2049, as a designer of implanted memories for replicants.

Selected filmography

Film

Television

Music video 

 Your Love Is Killing Me (2014) by Sharon Van Etten

Awards 
 2011: Best Supporting Actress for 180° at the Swiss Film Awards
 2012: Best Leading Actress at the Swiss Film Awards
 2013: Shooting Stars Award - Europe's Best Young Actors

References

External links
 

Living people
Swiss film actresses
1985 births
21st-century Swiss actresses
Swiss television actresses
People from Locarno
People from Ticino